Laff En Roll is a 2010 Philippine television comedy show broadcast by GMA Network. Hosted by Boy 2 Quizon and Glaiza de Castro, it premiered on January 19, 2010 on the network's A Bilib Ka Ba Araw-Araw line up. The show concluded on September 23, 2010.

Hosts

 Boy 2 Quizon
 Glaiza de Castro

Former host
 Tuesday Vargas

Ratings
According to AGB Nielsen Philippines' Mega Manila household television ratings, the pilot episode of Laff En Roll earned a 9.6% rating. While the final episode scored a 3.3% rating in Mega Manila People/Individual television ratings.

Accolades

References

External links
 

2010 Philippine television series debuts
2010 Philippine television series endings
Filipino-language television shows
GMA Network original programming
Philippine comedy television series